The Bigsby Medal is a medal of the Geological Society of London established by John Jeremiah Bigsby.  It is awarded for the study of American  geology.

Recipients
Source:The Geological Society

See also

 List of geology awards
 Prizes named after people

References

British science and technology awards
Geology awards
Geology of the United States
Awards of the Geological Society of London